Solare may be:

Juan María Solare, Argentine composer and pianist.
Solare (obelisk), an ancient Egyptian obelisk now in Rome.